The name Liberal Catholic Church (LCC) is used by a number of separate Christian churches throughout the world which are open to esoteric beliefs and hold many ideas in common.

Although the term Liberal Catholic might suggest otherwise, it does not refer to liberal groups within the Roman Catholic Church but to groups within the Independent Catholic movement, unrecognised by and not in communion with the Holy See.

History

1941 schism 
In 1941, a schism occurred in the church due to breaches of canon law and the laws of the state of California on the part of the Presiding Bishop, which led in 1959 to the church known abroad as the Liberal Catholic Church International earning the legal right to be known as the Liberal Catholic Church in the United States. In America, the entity originally known as the Liberal Catholic Church is known as "The Liberal Catholic Church, Province of the United States of America."

The Young Rite

In 2006, former LCC Presiding Bishop Johannes van Alphen consecrated Markus van Alphen who, in turn, established the Young Rite. Bishop Johannes himself eventually joined the Young Rite, serving until his death. Among the tenets of the Young Rite was the belief that all possessed a path to the priesthood, and anyone requesting ordination should receive it. This practice was abandoned in the United States after Markus van Alphen's retirement and with the establishment of the Community of Saint George, a Young Rite jurisdiction and the only recognized one in the United States. Young Rite USA now requires a multi-year formation program for its clergy.

Teaching
Many in the church accept the concept of purgatory, and in the liturgy of the mass the priest prays for the dead. The church is open to reincarnation.

Sacraments

Movement

The Liberal Catholic movement refers to those churches whose foundation traces back to the founding bishops of The Liberal Catholic Church. The Liberal Catholic movement is one of the most recognized Old Catholic groups in the United States.

Movement background 
The founding bishop of the Liberal Catholic Church was J. I. Wedgwood who was ordained as a priest in the Old Catholic movement on July 22, 1913 by Arnold Harris Mathew (whose membership in the Union of Utrecht was terminated in 1910).

Denominations coming from the LCC

First schism and the LCCI 
Some of the clergy in the Liberal Catholic Church International returned to the Liberal Catholic Church, Province of the United States of America.

Old Catholic Apostolic Church 
The current Presiding Bishop is Adrian Glover, consecrated to the episcopacy in 2009 by John Kersey.

The Young Rite 
In 2006 another reform resulted in the formation of a new group called the Young Rite. The past Presiding Bishop of the "mother" Liberal Catholic Church, Johannes van Alphen, who had resigned from the LCC in 2002, had consecrated Mario Manuel Herrera (in 2002) who in turn had consecrated Benito Rodriguez Cruz (in 2005). These three bishops consecrated to the episcopacy Marcus van Alphen, a former priest of the Dutch Liberal Catholic Church, in June 2006 in Hilversum, The Netherlands. Bishop Johannes subsequently joined the Young Rite and remained active in it until his death on the 25th of January 2009. In March 2008 the bishops of the Young Rite and bishop (Aristid Havilcek of Slovenia) to the episcopacy.

Bishop Marcus started the Young Rite as an autocephalous group operating within the Liberal Catholic tradition, yet separate from any of the Liberal Catholic Church organizations. Although the Young Rite shares many beliefs and customs with the Liberal Catholic Church and derives its apostolic succession from it, they are not affiliated with any of the Liberal Catholic Church organizations. The book expounds further on the doctrine and philosophy regarding this rite.

The Young Rite operates in Slovenia. The Young Rite USA operates as the Community of St. George and is led by Presiding Bishops David Oliver Kling, Robert Lamoureaux and Bishop-elect Timothy Olivieri.

See also

 Free Church of Antioch
 Warren Prall Watters
Old Catholic

References

Further reading 

 

Christian denominations established in the 20th century
LGBT and Catholicism
Independent Catholic denominations
LGBT churches
Christian organizations established in 1913
Theosophy